, previously known as , is a Japanese-language daily sports newspaper. In 2002, it had a circulation of a million copies a day.

It is an affiliate newspaper of Yomiuri Shimbun.

Reports

19 September 1939: SS Scharnhorst 
The Hochi Shimbun newspaper was mentioned in an article in The Singapore Free Press and Mercantile Advertiser on September 20, 1939 concerning the conversion of the SS Scharnhorst into the escort carrier Shin'yō by the Imperial Japanese Navy.

See also 
Hochi Film Award
Golden Spirit Award

References

External links
  

Daily newspapers published in Japan
Sports newspapers published in Japan